Netherlands competed at the 1964 Summer Paralympics in Tokyo, Japan. The team included 8 athletes, 5 men and 3 women. Competitors from Netherlands won 14 medals, including 4 gold, 6 silver and 4 bronze to finish 10th in the medal table.

Medalists

Source: www.paralympic.org & www.olympischstadion.nl

Competitors
A team of 7 men and 3 women  were announced in the newspaper on 23 October 1964. In the newspaper of 20 November (after the Paralympics) was written "ten became eleven".

The name of the 11th person was not named.

Men
Popke Popkema
Peter Blanker
Gerard Jacobs
Piet Imming
Dik Kruidenier
Cor Prins
Yap Soem Lie

Women
Marion de Groot
Elka Gaarlandt
Cissy Morel

Archery
The Dutch team consisted of three archers.
 2x  Peter Blanker
 Popke Popkema
 7th - Geert Imming

Athletics

Swimming

Table tennis

See also
Netherlands at the Paralympics
Netherlands at the 1964 Summer Olympics

References 

Nations at the 1964 Summer Paralympics
1964
Summer Paralympics